The P&O Steam Line Silverstone 500 miles was the second round of the 1999 FIA GT Championship. It took place at the Silverstone Circuit, United Kingdom, on 9 May 1999. This event was also designated as the British Empire Trophy for the year.

Official results
Cars failing to complete 70% of winner's distance are marked as Not Classified (NC).

Statistics
 Pole position – #1 Chrysler Viper Team Oreca – 1:49.266
 Fastest lap – #2 Chrysler Viper Team Oreca – 1:50.763
 Average speed – 154.989 km/h

References

 
 
 

S
FIA GT Silverstone
May 1999 sports events in the United Kingdom